Vladimir Viktorovich Tsyplakov (18 April 1969 – 14 December 2019) was a Belarusian professional ice hockey player winger.  He was drafted in the third round, 59th overall, by the Los Angeles Kings in the 1995 NHL Entry Draft.

Tsyplakov was also an assistant coach with the Belarus men's national ice hockey team. He died at the age of 50 in 2019.

Playing career
Tsyplakov played six seasons in the Soviet Union with Torpedo Yaroslavl and HC Dynamo Minsk. He played three seasons in the United States in the International Hockey League.

He made his National Hockey League debut with the Kings during the 1995–96 season and was on their roster until being traded to the Buffalo Sabres during the 1999–2000 season. After a season and a half with Buffalo, he returned to the Russian Superleague to play with AK Bars Kazan. Tsyplakov played for HC CSKA Moscow during the 2004–05 season.

During his NHL career Tsyplakov played in 331 games, recording 69 goals and 101 assists.

His elder brother Alexander also played the sport professionally and was selected for Belarus.

Career statistics

Regular season and playoffs

International

References

External links

1969 births
2019 deaths
Ak Bars Kazan players
Belarusian ice hockey coaches
Belarusian ice hockey left wingers
Buffalo Sabres players
Belarusian expatriate ice hockey people
Fort Wayne Komets players
HC CSKA Moscow players
HC Dinamo Minsk players
HC Dynamo Pardubice players
Ice hockey players at the 1998 Winter Olympics
Ice hockey players at the 2002 Winter Olympics
Indianapolis Ice players
Los Angeles Kings draft picks
Los Angeles Kings players
Las Vegas Thunder players
Lokomotiv Yaroslavl players
Olympic ice hockey players of Belarus
People from Inta
Place of death missing
Soviet ice hockey left wingers
Yunost Minsk players
Sportspeople from the Komi Republic
Russian ice hockey left wingers
Belarusian expatriate sportspeople in the Czech Republic
Russian expatriate sportspeople in the Czech Republic
Russian expatriate sportspeople in the United States
Russian expatriate ice hockey people
Belarusian expatriate sportspeople in the United States
Expatriate ice hockey players in the Czech Republic
Expatriate ice hockey players in the United States